The Chinese Swimming Association is the national federation which oversees aquatic sports in China. It is a national non-governmental, nonprofit sports organization which oversees competition in swimming, diving, synchronized swimming, water polo, and open water swimming.

It is affiliated with:
FINA, the International Swimming Federation;
the Asia Swimming Federation, the aquatics Continental Association for Asia;
the Chinese Olympic Committee; and 
the All-China Sports Federation.

See also
List of Chinese records in swimming

External links
Official Website

National members of the Asian Swimming Federation
China
Aquatics
Aquatics
Swimming in China